Vox T was a radio station in Iaşi, Romania. The station signed on in March 1990, as the first independent non-public radio station outside Bucharest, and the third in Romania, after the change from Socialist system. During its more than 20 years of broadcasting, Vox T enjoyed wide public interest with its phone-in talk-shows and music programmes.

History
Vox T first operated out of T17 students residence hall, part of the Gheorghe Asachi Technical University campus area, than from different locations, broadcasting its signal from a transmitter on top of the Moldova Hotel.

In 1996–2004, Vox T owned a branch in Bacău that broadcast local radio programmes, on 95.1 MHz (71.42 MHz - initial). During the time, it also operated broadcast licenses in Paşcani (102.2 MHz), Hârlău (87.6 MHz), Târgu Neamț (106.7 MHz), Huşi (94.5 MHz), Vaslui (88.5 MHz), and Putna (97.7 MHz). On the news side, Vox T collaborated with Romanian branches of the BBC World Service and RFI.

Radio Vox T closed down operations in November 2011.

See also
Media in Iaşi
List of radio stations in Romania

References

External links
Official website for Radio Vox T
Vox T Live

Vox T
Romanian-language radio stations
Defunct radio stations in Romania
1990 establishments in Romania
2011 disestablishments in Romania
Radio stations established in 1990
Radio stations disestablished in 2011